The High Commission of Mauritius in London is the diplomatic mission of Mauritius in the United Kingdom.

References

External links
 Official site
 Archive photo of the embassy building

Mauritius
Diplomatic missions of Mauritius
Mauritius–United Kingdom relations
Buildings and structures in the Royal Borough of Kensington and Chelsea
South Kensington